Helogenes castaneus is a species of whale catfish endemic to Colombia where it is found in the Guaviare River and Meta River drainages of the upper Orinoco River.  This species grows to a length of 4.7 cm (1.9 inches).

References 
 

Cetopsidae
Endemic fauna of Colombia
Freshwater fish of Colombia
Fish described in 1960